The Miwa are an Aboriginal Australian people of the Kimberley region of Western Australia.

Name
'Miwa' in this area of the Kimberley region is used in the sense of 'salt water/sea', indicating peoples near or on the coast. Three different groups, among them the Yeidji, have been called Miwa in this broader sense. Likewise the Ngarinjin called the Gija, Miwa. In this article the word describes the Miya associated with the King Edward River zone specified below.

Country
On the coast they lay about the eastern side of Napier Broome Bay, the lower King Edward River and eastwards to about Cape Bernier. Their inland extension reached as far as the vicinity of Mount Connelly, the Drysdale River and the Barton Plain. It also took in an area of the King George River and Manungu, the Miya name for the range at the headwaters of the Berkeley River. The Miwa were often subsumed, together with the Wirngir, under a larger ethnonym, Walar.

Alternative names
 Konun, Konan, Konin, Gonin.
 Kaianu, Kianu, Kyanoo.
 Murgura (eastern Miwa horde)
 Kuna. Kunange, Gunan, Koonange. Mande, Manda. Pago. (toponym at old Drysdale Mission).
 Bagu, Ba:gu. Manungu, Manunggu. (toponym)
 Galumburu. (toponym at new Drysdale River Mission)
 Kalumbura, Caloombooroo. Wulanggur. (Cape Talbot peninsula toponym and horde name)
 Ulaqgu. Wularjgu.(Ngarinjin exonym)
 Ulangu. Umari (King George River toponym)
 Pela.
 Boola.
 Pelange?
 Walar. (snake clan's name).

Notes

Citations

Sources

Aboriginal peoples of Western Australia
Kimberley (Western Australia)